Kzyl-Tan is a rural locality (a selo) in Aktyubinnsky Selsoviet of Volodarsky District, Astrakhan Oblast, Russia. The population was 141 as of 2010. There are 5 streets.

Geography 
Kzyl-Tan is located on the Kornevaya River, 3 km south of Volodarsky (the district's administrative centre) by road. Volodarsky is the nearest rural locality.

References 

Rural localities in Volodarsky District, Astrakhan Oblast